Jonathan Di Bella (born August 18, 1996) is a Canadian kickboxer, currently signed with ONE Championship where he is the current Kickboxing strawweight world champion.
As of November 2022, he is ranked as the ninth best bantamweight kickboxer in the world by Beyond Kick.

Kickboxing career

Early career
Di Bella began practicing martial arts at his father's Di Bella Kickboxing gym, where he acquired a Kyokushin karate black belt. He would go on to win 20 consecutive fights as an amateur kickboxer, with 13 of those victories coming by way of stoppage. Di Bella made his professional kickboxing debut against David Weintraub at Battle of the Millenium 3 on June 10, 2016. He won the fight by a second-round technical knockout, as he stopped his opponent with low kicks, after he knocked him down twice with left straights.

Glory Kickboxing
Di Bella made his Glory debut against Will Calhoun at Glory 33: New Jersey on September 9, 2016, in what was his second professional appearance. He won the fight by a first-round technical knockout, due to doctor stoppage.

After he beat Pampos Grigoriou by unanimous decision at Battle of the Millenium 4 on May 12, 2017, Di Bella was booked to face Lennox Chance at Glory 43: New York on July 14, 2017. He once again won by unanimous decision.

Di Bella won two more bouts, a unanimous decision over Tommy Espinosa at Glory 48: New York on December 1, 2017 and a first-round knockout of Chris Johnson at Battle of the Millenium 5 on April 13, 2018, before he was given the chance to face Ahmad Ibrahim for the ISKA North American Lightweight title at Glory 55: New York on July 20, 2018. He captured the title by unanimous decision.

Di Bella made his fifth and final promotional appearance with Glory against Mohammed Lemjerdine at Glory 61: New York on November 2, 2018. He won the fight by unanimous decision.

Di Bella would then depart from Glory and face Dejaun Mishael Davis for the ISKA East Coast Featherweight title at Combat at the Garden on April 20, 2019. He won the fight by unanimous decision.

ONE Championship
On June 1, 2020 it was announced Di Bella signed a contract with ONE Championship. Di Bella faced Zhang Peimian for the vacant ONE Kickboxing Strawweight Championship at ONE 162: Zhang vs. Di Bella on October 21, 2022, in what was his debut with the promotion. He captured the vacant title by unanimous decision.

Titles and accomplishments

Amateur
International Kickboxing Federation
 2014 IKF Junior Muay Thai Super Lightweight Championship

Professional
ONE Championship 
 2022 ONE Strawweight Kickboxing World Championship (125 lbs) (Current)
International Sport Kickboxing Association
 2018 ISKA North American Lightweight Championship
 2019 ISKA East Coast Featherweight Championship
 2019 ISKA Intercontinental Championship

Kickboxing record 

|-  style="background:#cfc;"
| 2022-09-29 || Win ||align=left| Zhang Peimian || ONE 161: Petchmorakot vs. Tawanchai || Kallang, Singapore || Decision (Unanimous) || 5|| 3:00
|-
! style=background:white colspan=9 |

|-  bgcolor= "#CCFFCC"
| 2019-12-06|| Win ||align=left| Nick Burgos || Combat at the Garden 2 || New York, United States || TKO (Referee stoppage) || 3 || 2:36 
|-
! style=background:white colspan=9 |

|-  bgcolor= "#CCFFCC"
| 2019-04-20|| Win ||align=left| Dejaun Mishael Davis || Combat at the Garden || New York, United States || Decision (Unanimous) || 3 || 3:00 
|-
! style=background:white colspan=9 |

|- style="text-align:center; background:#cfc;"
| 2018-11-02 || Win ||align=left| Mohammed Lemjerdine || Glory 61: New York || New York City, New York, United States || Decision (Unanimous) || 3 || 3:00

|-  bgcolor= "#CCFFCC"
| 2018-07-20|| Win ||align=left| Ahmad Ibrahim || Glory 55: New York || New York, United States || Decision (Unanimous) || 3 || 3:00 
|-
! style=background:white colspan=9 |

|-  style="background:#cfc;"
| 2018-04-13 || Win ||align=left| Chris Johnson || Battle of the Millenium 5 || New York City, New York, USA || KO (High kick) || 1 || 1:20

|- style="background:#cfc;"
| 2017-12-01 || Win ||align=left| Tommy Espinosa || Glory 48: New York || New York City, New York United States || Decision (Unanimous) || 3 || 3:00

|-  style="background:#cfc;"
| 2017-07-14 || Win ||align=left| Lennox Chance || Glory 43: New York || New York City, New York, USA || Decision (Unanimous) || 3 || 3:00

|-  style="background:#cfc;"
| 2017-05-12 || Win ||align=left| Pampos Grigoriou || Battle of the Millenium 4 || New York City, New York, USA || Decision (Unanimous) || 3 || 3:00

|-  style="background:#cfc;"
| 2016-09-09 || Win ||align=left| Will Calhoun || Glory 33: New Jersey|| Trenton, New Jersey, USA || TKO (Doctor stoppage) || 1 || 3:00

|-  style="background:#cfc;"
| 2016-06-10 || Win ||align=left| David Weintraub || Battle of the Millenium 3 || New York City, New York, USA || TKO (Low kicks)  || 2 ||

|-
| colspan=9 | Legend:    

|-  style="background:#cfc;"
| 2015-12-07 || Win ||align=left| Cornell Ward || Battle of the Millenium 2 || New York City, New York, USA || TKO (corner stoppage) || 2 ||

|-  style="background:#cfc;"
| 2014-07-13 || Win ||align=left| Ethan Doucette || 2014 IKF World Classic Amateur Kickboxing Championships, Final  || Orlando, Florida, USA || KO  || 1 || 1:16 
|-
! style=background:white colspan=9 |

|-  style="background:#cfc;"
| 2014-07-12 || Win ||align=left| Marquis Mike || 2014 IKF World Classic Amateur Kickboxing Championships, Semi Final  || Orlando, Florida, USA || TKO  || 2 || 2:00

|-  style="background:#cfc;"
| 2014-07-11 || Win ||align=left| Trevor Oden || 2014 IKF World Classic Amateur Kickboxing Championships, Quarter Final  || Orlando, Florida, USA || TKO  || 1 || 1:08

|-
| colspan=9 | Legend:

Professional boxing record

{|class="wikitable" style="text-align:center"
|-
!
!Result
!Record
!Opponent
!Type
!Round, time
!Date
!Location
!Notes
|-
|2
|Win
|2–0
|style="text-align:left;"| Jesus Omar Chavez Velazquez
|
|2 (4), 
|
|29 Jul 2022
|style="text-align:left;"| 
|-
|1
|Win
|1–0
|style="text-align:left;"| Brian Lopez Salinas
|
|4 (4), 
|3:00
|2 Jun 2022
|style="text-align:left;"| 
|-
| colspan=10 | Legend:

See also 
List of male kickboxers

References

1996 births
Living people
Canadian male kickboxers
ONE Championship kickboxers